Berlin-Frohnau (in German S-Bahnhof Berlin-Frohnau) is a railway station in the neighbourhood of Frohnau, in the city of Berlin, Germany. It is served by the Berlin S-Bahn and by several local buses.

History
The station building with the low-level railway platform was also built by the railway management in Berlin from 1908 to 1910, according to a design by Gustav Hart and Alfred Lesser (Hart & Lesser). The Berlin Terrain-Centrale, which at that time opened up Frohnau as a new settlement area, paid a construction cost of 30,000 Marks and took over the operating costs for four years. Long before the establishment of Frohnaus, the Nordbahn between Berlin and Stralsund had been operating here since 1877. From 1891 it was developed two-fold. On the place of today's station Frohnau stood a train station house. The next stations were Hermsdorf in the south and Stolpe in the north (Stolpe station was just north of today's disability settlement and closed in 1924). When the Frohnauer Bridge was laid out in 1909, the railroad tracks were lowered, the surrounding area was laid, and the road bridge was built as a link between the districts built by the railway. On 1 May 1910 the new station Frohnau was inaugurated; 1640 visitors were counted. On 1 April 1925, the line to Oranienburg was electrified.

Frohnau was the northern terminus of the S-Bahn S1 from 1961 to 1992 due to the construction of Berlin Wall. Despite the shrinking passenger numbers as a result of the S-Bahn boycott used after 1961, the operation along the Nordbahn was maintained and even continued after the Berlin S-Bahn strike 1980. It was only when the BVG was taken over by the BVG on 9 January 1984 that the company ceased operations. After the takeover of the company, the passengers were offered massive protests for a company, and they were resumed on 1 October 1984. However, this only lasted until May 1986, the route was then extensively rehabilitated and the second route was rebuilt. On 22 December 1986 the work had been completed. Between 1984 and 1986, the railway station's travel facilities were renovated.

References

External links
Station information 

Berlin S-Bahn stations
Railway stations in Berlin
Buildings and structures in Reinickendorf
Berlin Frohnau